Georgemy Gonçalves (born 15 August 1995) is a Brazilian football player who plays as goalkeeper for Vila Nova.

Club career

Early career
Georgemy started his youth football career at Cruzeiro.

Cruzeiro
On 1 July 2015, Georgemy was called up for Cruzeiro first team.

Estoril (loan)
On 13 July 2015, he was loaned to Estoril for a season. He made his professional league debut against C.D. Tondela on 15 February 2016. In this game, he played 6 minutes of the game, after he replaced Leo Bonatini. He played 6 games for Estoril and gave up 7 goals.

Vitória de Guimarães (loan)
On 19 July 2016, he was loaned to Vitória de Guimarães.

International career
He was a member of Brazil national under-20 football team for 2015 FIFA U-20 World Cup Brazil finished the competition as runners-up, but Georgemy didn't play any games in the competition.

Club career statistics

References

1995 births
Living people
Brazilian footballers
Vitória S.C. players
G.D. Estoril Praia players
Tupi Football Club players
Guarani FC players
Villa Nova Atlético Clube players
Boa Esporte Clube players
Liga Portugal 2 players
Primeira Liga players
Association football goalkeepers